Grimm's Fairy Tale Classics, also known as Grimm Masterpiece Theater (グリム名作劇場 Gurimu meisaku gekijō) in the original version and The Grimm's Fairy Tales (in Australia and New Zealand), is a Japanese anime anthology series by Nippon Animation based on the Grimms' Fairy Tales.

Premise 
Grimm's Fairy Tale Classics adapted several old favorites, taking liberties in some cases. The series also contains many obscure fairy tales, though some of these were removed from later reissues of the volume. Some were eliminated because they originated outside Germany, and therefore didn't appear in the Brothers Grimm's collection of stories, such as Puss in Boots, Bluebeard and Beauty and the Beast. The Worn-Out Dancing Shoes instead is based on a variation of the tale reported by the Brothers Grimm in the notes of the first edition of the book. Most of the tales were presented in one episode, while some stories in the first season were told over two or four episodes, for a total of 41 fairy tales. Similarly to Andersen Stories (1971), a green-haired female pixie was used as a framing device, though limiting herself to announce the titles and never getting involved with the plot.

The show comprises two series. Both series were produced by Nippon Animation with the cooperation of Asahi Broadcasting Corporation in Osaka. It was also localized under the series' English name.

The fairy tale anthology was broadcast in the United States by Nickelodeon, in local stations throughout Europe, Latin America, Philippines, Israel, Arab World, New Zealand and Australia.

Episodes

Series 1

Series 2

Cast

Japanese cast 
 Mitsuko Horie - Narrator, Little Red Riding Hood (in "Little Red Riding Hood"), Princess (in "The Golden Goose"), Rose-Red (in "Snow-White and Rose-Red"), Princess (in "The Water of Life"), Katja (in "Jorinde and Joringel"), Princess (in "Briar Rose"), Youngest Daughter (in "The Shoes that were Danced to Pieces"), Cinderella (in "Cinderella"), Maria (in "Beauty and the Beast"), Witch Daughter (in "The Magic Heart"), Rapunzel (in "Rapunzel"), Hildegard (in "Mother Holle"), Princess (in "The Four Skillful Brothers"), Princess (in "The Six Swans"), Cristina (in "Bearskin"), Lily (in "The Mariage of Mrs. Fox"), Princess (in "The Coat of Many Colours)", Princess (in "Iron Hans"), Princess (in "The Iron Stove"), Wren Child (in "The Wren and The Bear"), Hunchman's Wife (in "The Water Nixie")
 Sanji Hase - Donkey (in "The Travelling Musicians of Bremen"), Heinrich (in "The Frog Prince")
 Kenichi Ogata - Cat (in "The Travelling Musicians of Bremen"), Hunchman (in "Little Red Riding Hood"), Shoemaker (in "Puss in Boots"), King (in "Briar Rose"), Hat Man (in "The Six Who Went Far in the World"), Rooster (in "Mother Holle"), Spirit (in "The Spirit in the Bottle"), Frog (in "The Iron Stove"), Sisters' Father (in "Bearskin"), King (in "The Man of Iron"), General (in "The Brave Little Tailor"), Wolf (in "The Wren and The Bear"), God (in "Godfather Death") 
 Ryusei Nakao - Rooster (in "The Travelling Musicians of Bremen"), Hedgehog (in "The Hare and the Hedgehog")
 Osamu Kato - Head Thief (in "The Travelling Musicians of Bremen")
 Ritsuo Sawa - Lacky (in "The Travelling Musicians of Bremen")
 Minoru Inaba - Miller (in "The Travelling Musicians of Bremen"), Woodcuter (in "Little Red Riding Hood"), Hans' Father (in "The Golden Goose"), Cook and Farmer (in "Puss in Boots"), Councilor (in "The Six Who Went Far in the World"), North Wind (in "The Water of Life"), Soldier (in "Briar Rose"), Cook (in "King Thrushbeard"), Captain (in "The Naughty Spirit"), Restaurateur (in "King Thrushbeard"), Four-tailed Fox (in "The Marriage of Mrs. Fox"), Child (in "The Six Swans"), Soldier (in "Iron Stove"), Craftsman (in "The Man of Iron"), Councilor (in "Rumpelstilzchen")
 Yoshino Ohtori - Miller's Wife(in "The Travelling Musicians of Bremen"), Old Woman (in "King Thrushbeard"), Stepmother (in "Mother Holle")
 Mami Koyama - Hansel (in "Hansel and Gretel")
 Chieko Honda - Gretel (in "Hansel and Gretel"), Witch (in "The Iron Stove")
 Miyoko Asō - Witch (in "Hansel and Gretel"), Witch (in "Jorinde and Joringel"), Witch (in "Rapunzel")
 Shunsuke Shima - Father (in "Hansel and Gretel")
 Chie Kitagawa - Stepmother (in "Hansel and Gretel")
 Shigeru Chiba - Frog Prince (in "The Frog Prince"), Dwarf (in "Snow White"), Hunchman (in "The Six Who Went Far in the World"), Devil (in "The Marriage of Mrs. Fox"), Fox (in "The Wren and The Bear")
 Yoshino Takamori - Princess (in "The Frog Prince")
 Daisuke Gōri - Soldier (in "The Frog Prince"), Hunchman and Dwarf (in "Snow White"), Devil (in "The Water of Life"), Devil (in "The Water of Life"), Monster (in "The Crystal Ball"), Beast (in "Beauty and Beast"), Head Cook (in "The Coat of Many Colours"), Giant (in "The Brave Little Tailor")
 Takuzo Kamiyama - King (in "The Frog Prince"), King (in "Puss in Boots"), King (in "The Six Who Went Far in the World"), Landlord (in "The Grave Mound"), King (in "The Brave Little Tailor")
 Nana Yamaguchi - Queen (in "The Frog Prince"), Mother Holle (in "Mother Holle"), Queen (in "The Man of Iron"), Old Woman (in "The Water Nixie")
 Kōzō Shioya - Soldier (in "The Frog Prince"), Franz (in "The Golden Goose"), Snorter Man (in "The Six Who Went Far in the World"), Eldest Prince (in "The Water of Life"), Second Brother (in "Bluebeard"), Farmer (in "Old Sultan"), King Turna (in "King Thrushbeard"), Deserted Soldier (in "The Naughty Spirit"), Devil (in "The Shoes that were Danced to Pieces"), Dove Husband (in "Cinderella"), Fox Hunk (in "The Marriage of Mrs. Fox"), Hare (in "The Hare and the Hedgehog")
 Shinobu Adachi - Sister of Princess (in "The Frog Prince"), Dove Wife (in "Cinderella"), Hen in ("Mother Holle")
 Tomoko Maruo - Sister of Princess (in "The Frog Prince"), Maid (in "Snow White"), Maid (in "Bluebeard"), Witch (in "Sleeping Beauty"), Woman (in "The Worn-Out Dancing Shoes"), Stepsister in ("Cinderella")
 Tesshô Genda - Wolf (in "Little Red Riding Hood"), Eldest Brother (in "Bluebeard"), Devil (in "The Naughty Spirit"), Mr. Fox (in "The Marriage of Mrs. Fox")
 Terue Nunami - Grandmother (in "Little Red Riding Hood")
 Chiyoko Kawashima - Mother (in "Little Red Riding Hood"), Farmer's Wife (in "The Grave Mound"), Tetra (in "Bearskin")
 Kimie Hantani - Village Woman (in "Little Red Riding Hood"), Princess (in "Puss in Boots"), Maid (in "The Life of Water"), Child (in "The Grave Mound")
 Ichirô Nagai - Puss in Boots (in "Puss in Boots"), Old Woodsman (in "The Water of Life"), Dwarf (in "Snow White"), Old Wolf (in "Old Sultan"), King (in "Cinderella"), Father (in "The Four Skillful Brothers"), Rumpelstiltskin (in "Rumpelstiltskin"), Wolf (in "The Wolf and the Fox")
 Yoku Shioya - Youngest Son (in "Puss in Boots"), Youngest Prince (in "The Water of Life"), Youngest Brother (in "Crystal Ball"), Hunchman (in "The Magic Heart"), Woodcutter's Son (in "The Spirit in the Bottle"), Fox (in "The Wolf and the Fox"), Tailor (in "The Brave Little Tailor")
 Ken Yamaguchi - Gatekeeper and Farmer (in "Puss in Boots"), Trot Man (in "The Six Who Went Far in the World")
 Kayoko Fujii - Snow-White (in "Snow-White and Rose-Red"), Elder Daughter (in "The Shoes that were Danced to Pieces")
 Kaneto Shiozawa - Bear/Eldest Prince (in "Snow-White and Rose-Red"), Prince (in "Beauty and the Beast")
 Nobuo Tobita - Youngest Prince (in "Snow-White and Rose-Red")
 Keiko Hanagata - Mother (in "Snow-White and Rose-Red")
 Bin Shimada - Hans (in "The Golden Goose"), Dwarf (in "Snow White"), Deserted Soldier (in "The Naughty Spirit"), Johan (in "Bearskin"), Hunchman(in "The Water Nixie")
 Reiko Suzuki - Hans' Mother (in "The Golden Goose"), Witch (in "Sleeping Beauty")
 Ryūji Saikachi - Old Woodman (in "The Golden Goose")
 Takeo Ono - Minister (in "The Golden Goose")
 Kazumi Tanaka - Minister's Pupil (in "The Golden Goose"), Waiter (in "King Thrushbeard")
 Kyōko Tongū - Girl in Hotel (in "The Golden Goose"), Deserted Soldier (in "The Naughty Spirit"), Stepsister (in "Cinderella"), Princess (in "The Brave Little Tailor")
 Hiroko Emori - Girl in Hotel (in "The Golden Goose")
 Masaharu Sato - Councilor (in "The Golden Goose"), Captain (in "The Six Who Went Far in the World"), Old Man (in "Jorinde and Joringel"), Miller (in "The Magic Heart"), Servant (in "Brother and Sister")
 Ikuya Sawaki - Farmer (in "The Golden Goose"), Farmer (in "The Six Who Went Far in the World"), Thief (in "The Old Woman in the Woods"), General (in "The Water of Life"), General (in "The Brave Little Tailor") 
 Sakiko Tamagawa - Snow White (in "Snow White")
 Nozomu Sasaki - Klaus (in "Snow White")
 Kazue Komiya - Queen (in "Snow White"), Witch (in "Briar Rose")
 Gara Takashima - Magic Mirror (in "Snow White"), Katja's Mother (in "Jorinde and Joringel"), Rapunzel's Mother (in "Rapunzel"), Wife (in "Godfather Death")
 Haru Endo - Doris (in "Snow White")
 Kōhei Miyauchi - Dwarf (in "Snow White"), King (in "The Water of Life", "The Shoes that were Danced to Pieces", "Godfather Death" and "The Iron Stove"), Woodcutter (in "The Spirit in the Bottle")
 Jouji Yanami - Dwarf (in "Snow White"), Old Sultan (in "Old Sultan"), Old Helmut (in "The Hare and the Hedgehog")
 Toshiya Ueda - Dwarf (in "Snow White")
 Shinji Ogawa - Soldier (in "The Six Who Went Far in the World")
 Yuu Shimaka - Powerful (in "The Six Who Went Far in the World")
 Chihoko Shigeta - Princess (in "The Six Who Went Far in the World"), Irene (in "Mother Holle")
 Jun'ichi Sugawara - Khight (in "The Six Who Went Far in the World")
 Yōsuke Akimoto - Young Man (in "The Water of Life")
 Katsunosuke Hori - Bluebeard (in "Bluebeard")
 Keiko Han - Princess (in "Bluebeard")
 Mitsuaki Hoshino - Servant (in "Bluebeard"), Guard and Woodcutter (in "Cinderella"), Third-tailed Fox (in "The Mariage of Mrs. Fox"), Thief (in "The Old Woman in the Wood"), Man (in "The Man of Iron")、Bee (in "The Wren and The Bear"), Landlord (in "The Water Nixie")
 Hiromi Tsuru - Jorinde (in "Jorinde and Joringel"), Hilda (in "Rumpelstiltskin")
 Masami Kikuchi - Joringel (in "Jorinde and Joringel"), Prince (in "Cinderella"), Third Brother (in "The Six Swans"), Youngest Brother (in "The Four Skillful Brothers")
 Aki Saito - Queen (in "Cinderella")
 Kimie Nakajima - Stepmother (in "Cinderella")
 Masaya Taki - Chamberlain (in "Cinderella"), Councilor (in "The Coat of Many Colours"), Father (in "Rumpelstiltskin")
 Tsuboi Akiko - Queen (in "Briar Rose")
 Hideyuki Hori - Prince (in "Briar Rose"), Prince (in "The Six Swans"), Stove/Prince in ("The Iron Stove")
 Keaton Yamada - Councilor (in "Briar Rose"), Old Man (in "The Magic Heart"), Frog (in "The Iron Stove"), Soldier (in "The Brave Little Tailor"), Miller (in "The Water Nixie")
 Tomie Kataoka - Witch (in "Briar Rose")
 Kōji Totani - Messenger (in "Briar Rose"), King Franz (in "King Thrushbeard"), Smith (in "The Spirit in the Bottle")
 Kazuyo Aoki - Cat (in "Old Sultan") 
 Keisuke Yamashita - Boar (in "Old Sultan") 
 Atsuko Mine - Miller's Wife (in "Old Sultan"), Duck Mother (in "The Wolf and The Fox"), Nanny (in "Brother and Sister")
 Sumi Shimamoto - Princess Erina (in "King Thrushbeard")
 Akio Nojima - King Thrushbeard (in "King Thrushbeard")
 Osamu Saka - King (in "King Thrushbeard"), King (in "The Coat of Many Colours"), Maria's Father (in "Beauty and Beast")
 Shōzō Iizuka - King of Hell (in "The Naughty Spirit")
 Naoki Tatsuta - Reaper (in "The Naughty Spirit"), Fox (in "The Hare and the Hedgehog")
 Yukimasa Kishino - Devil (in "The Naughty Spirit")
 Michitaka Kobayashi - Devil (in "The Naughty Spirit"), Man (in "The Shoes that were Danced to Pieces"), Thief (in "The Old Woman in the Wood"), Child (in "The Six Swans"), Soldier (in "Coat of Many Colors"), Hotel's Owner (in "Bearskin"), Town Man (in "Rumpelstiltskin"), Coachman (in "Godfather Death") 
 Michie Tomizawa - Second Daughter (in "The Shoes that were Danced to Pieces")
 Kazuhiko Inoue - Soldier (in "The Shoes that were Danced to Pieces"), Doctor (in "Godfather Death") 
 Masashi Ebara - Devil (in "The Shoes that were Danced to Pieces")
 Machiko Washio - Witch (in "The Crystal Ball")
 Kumiko Takizawa - Mrs. Fox (in "The Marriage of Mrs. Fox")
 Kōichi Yamadera - Two-tailed Fox (in "The Marriage of Mrs. Fox"), Oldest Brother (in "The Six Swans")
 Masako Katsuki - Hanna (in "Beauty and Beast")
 Miho Yoshida - Helen (in "Beauty and Beast")
 Daiki Nakamura - Florist (in "Beauty and Beast"), Soldier (in "Brother and Sister"), 
 Reiko Yamada - Witch (in "The Magic Heart"), Witch (in "Brother and Sister")
 Katsuji Mori - Prince (in "Rapunzel")
 Hōchū Ōtsuka - Rapunzel's Father (in "Rapunzel"), Rabbit (in "Mother Holle"), Soldier (in "The Grave Mound"), Eldest Brother (in "The Four Skillful Brothers")
 Megumi Hayashibara - Rapunzel's Son (in "Rapunzel"), Child (in "The Hare and the Hedgehog"), Girl and Wren Child (in "The Wren and The Bear")
 Toshio Furukawa - Prince (in "The Old Woman in the Woods")
 Hiroko Maruyama - Witch (in "The Old Woman in the Woods")
 Miyoko Aoba - Woman (in "The Old Woman in the Woods")
 Tomomichi Nishimura - Thief (in "The Old Woman in the Woods")
 Hiroshi Izawa - Farmer (in "The Grave Mound")
 Takeshi Aono - Devil (in "The Grave Mound"), Devil (in "Bearskin")
 Kazuo Oka - Minister (in "The Grave Mound")
 Yumiko Shibata - Child (in "The Grave Mound")
 Takurō Kitagawa - Deer (in "The Wolf and The Fox"), Farmer (in "The Man of Iron"), Councilor (in "Godfather Death") 
 Junko Hagimori - Baby Duck (in "The Wolf and The Fox"), Boy (in "The Coat of Many Colours"), Boy (in "The Spirit in The Bottle"), Child (in "The Hare and the Hedgehog"), Wren Child (in "The Wren and The Bear"), Miller's Son (in "The Water Nixie")
 Yukitoshi Hori - Farmer (in "The Wolf and The Fox"), Child (in "The Six Swans")
 Toshiko Fujita - Witch (in "The Six Swans"), Prince (in "The Man of Iron")
 Unshō Ishizuka - King (in "The Six Swans")
 Hiroshi Takemura - Second Brother (in "The Six Swans") 
 Keiichi Nanba - Fourth Brother (in "The Six Swans") 
 Show Hayami - Prince (in "The Coat of Many Colours")
 Yuriko Yamamoto - Rosa (in "Brother and Sister")
 Mayumi Tanaka - Rudolf (in "Brother and Sister")
 Hideyuki Tanaka - King (in "Brother and Sister")
 Yō Yoshimura - Second Brother (in "The Four Skillful Brothers"), Mosquito (in "The Wren and The Bear")
 Toshiharu Sakurai - Third Brother (in "The Four Skillful Brothers")
 Masato Hirano - Knight (in "The Four Skillful Brothers"), Cook (in "The Man of Iron"), Man (in "Rumpelstiltskin"), Butler (in "Godfather Death") 
 Chie Satō - Girl (in "The Iron Stove")
 Ai Orikasa - Boy (in "Bearskin")
 Noriko Uemura - Mrs. Hedgehog (in "The Hare and the Hedgehog"), Witch (in "Briar Rose"), Woman (in "Rapunzel"), Housewife (in "The Wolf and Fox"), Witch Mother (in "The Six Swans"), Mother (in "The Spirit in the Bottle"), Housewife (in "Bearskin"), Old Woman (in "The Wren and The Bear"), Miller's Wife (in "The Water Nixie"), Mother (in "Godfather Death")
 Chika Sakamoto - Hedgehog Son (in "The Hare and the Hedgehog")
 Banjou Ginga - Iron Hans (in "The Man of Iron")
 Katsumi Suzuki - Soldier (in "The Brave Little Tailor")
 Shunsuke Sakimiya - Soldier (in "The Brave Little Tailor")
 Norio Wakamoto - Wren (in "The Wren and The Bear")
 Hiroshi Masuoka - Bear (in "The Wren and The Bear")
 Jūrōta Kosugi - King (in "Rumpelstiltskin")
 Rihoko Yoshida - Nymph (in "The Water Nixie")
 Chikao Ohtsuka - Death (in "Godfather Death") 
 Miki Itō - Child (in "Godfather Death")

English cast 
 Theodore Lehmann - Narrator
 Robert Axelrod - Rooster (in "The Bremen Town Musicians"), Hunter (in "The Six Who Went Far"), Bluebeard's Herald (in "Bluebeard"), Messenger (in "The Worn Out Dancing Shoes"), Prince (in "The Worn Out Dancing Shoes"), Hare (in "The Hare and the Hedgehog")
 Arlene Banas - Mother (in "Snow White & Rose-Red"), Evil Queen (in "Snow White and the Seven Dwarfs")
 Robert V. Barron - Nobleman (in "The Worn-Out Dancing Shoes"), Mr. Fox (in "The Wedding of Mrs. Fox"), Vendor (in "Beauty & the Beast"), Old Man (in "The Magic Heart"), Servant (in "Brother & Sister"), Gretchen's father (in "Rumpelstiltskin")
 Bill Capizzi - Cook (in "King Grizzlebeard"), Rabbit (in "Mother Holle"), Crab (in "The Hare & the Hedgehog"), Rumpelstiltskin (in "Rumpelstiltskin")
 Frank Catalano - Prince (in "The Coat of Many Colors")
 Ardwight Chamberlain - Franz (in "The Four Skillful Brothers"), Johan (in "Bearskin")
 Louise Chamis - Peasant's Wife (in "The Bremen Town Musicians")
 Cheryl Chase - 
 Tony Clay - Enchanted Tree (in "Cinderella")
 Lara Cody - Jorinde (in "Jorinde & Joringel"), Princess Briar Rose (in "Sleeping Beauty"), Cinderella (in "Cinderella"), Princess (in "The Six Swans"), Rudolf (in "Brother & Sister")
 Richard Epcar - Iron Hans (in "The Man of Iron"), Soldier (in "The Brave Little Tailor")
 Michael Forest - King (in "The Four Skillful Brothers"), John (in "The Spirit in the Bottle"), King (in "The Man of Iron")
 Rebecca Forstadt - Gretel (in "Hansel and Gretel"), Rose-Red (in "Snow-White and Rose-Red"), Rosa (in "Brother and Sister")
 Eddie Frierson - Peter (in "The Worn-Out Dancing Shoes")
 Barbara Goodson - Ilene (in "Mother Holle")
 Melora Harte - Additional Voices
 Milton James - Donkey (in "The Bremen Town Musicians"), King's Chamberlain (in "The Six Who Went Far"), Devil (in "The Faithful Watchman"), Demon (in "Bearskin")
 Steve Kramer - Lead Thief (in "The Bremen Town Musicians"), Father (in "Hansel and Gretel"), Henry (in "The Princess & the Frog"), Big Bad Wolf (in "Little Red Riding Hood"), Priest ("in "The Golden Goose"), Guard (in "The Golden Goose"), Puss (in "Puss in Boots"), Subject (in "The Water of Life"), Old Cat (in "Old Sultan"), Customer (in "King Grizzlebeard"), Devil (in "The Wedding of Mrs. Fox"), Shopkeeper (in "The Wedding of Mrs. Fox"), Priest (in "The Faithful Watchman"), Wolf (in "The Wolf and The Fox"), Prince #4 (in "The Six Swans"), Servant (in "The Six Swans"), Cook (in "The Coat of Many Colors"), Hedgehog (in "The Hedgehog and the Hare"), Fisherman (in "The Man of Iron"), Soldier (in "The Brave Little Tailor"), Captain (in "The Brave Little Tailor"), Man (in "Rumpelstiltskin")
 Doug Lee - Magic Mirror (in "Snow White and the Seven Dwarfs")
 Wendee Lee - Princess Leonora (in "The Princess & the Frog"), First Princess (in "The Worn-Out Dancing Shoes")
 Julie Maddalena - Snow-White (in "Snow White & Rose-Red"), Snow White (in "Snow White and the Seven Dwarfs")
 Melanie MacQueen - 
 Kerrigan Mahan - Peasant (in "The Bremen Town Musicians"), Monday (in "Snow White and the Seven Dwarfs"), Prince Franz (in "The Water of Life"), Second Bohemian Soldier (in "The Naughty Spirit"), Demon #1 (in "The Worn-Out Dancing Shoes"), First Prince (in "The Six Swans"), Other Lumberjack (in "The Spirit in the Bottle"), Fox (in "The Hare & the Hedgehog"), King Wren (in "The Wren & the Bear")
 Dave Mallow - Bear/Prince (in "Snow-White and Rose-Red"), Hero (in "The Six Who Went Far"), Chemist (in "The Water of Life"), Third Brother (in "Bluebeard"), Prince (in "Sleeping Beauty"), King Grizzlebeard (in "King Grizzlebeard"), Musician (in "King Grizzlebeard"), Owl (in "The Old Woman in the Woods"), Prince (in "The Old Woman in the Woods"), Peasant (in "The Faithful Watchman"), Watchman (in "The Faithful Watchman"), Fox (in "The Wolf and the Fox"), Wilhelm (in "The Four Skillful Brothers"), Lumberjack's Son (in The Spirit in the Bottle"), Fox (in "The Wren and the Bear"), Wren Chick (in "The Wren and the Bear")
 Edward Mannix - Saturday (in "Snow White and the Seven Dwarfs"), Market Man (in "King Grizzlebeard"), Maria's Father (in "Beauty & the Beast")
 Michael McConnohie - Cat (in "The Bremen Town Musicians"), King (in "The Six Swans"), King (in "Brother & Sister")
 Edie Mirman - The Witch (in "Hansel and Gretel"), The Queen (in "The Princess & the Frog"), Little Red Riding Hood's Grandmother (in "Little Red Riding Hood"), Gisella (in "Bearskin")
 Tony Oliver - The Altar Boy (in "The Golden Goose"), Prince Joseph (in "The Water of Life"), Prince (in "Cinderella"), Four-Tailed Fox (in "The Wedding of Mrs. Fox"), Deer (in "The Wolf and the Fox"), Prince (in "The Six Swans")
 Simon Prescott - King (in "The Princess & the Frog"), Bluebeard (in "Bluebeard"), King (in "Sleeping Beauty"), King (in "The Worn-Out Dancing Shoes")
 Mike Reynolds - King (in "Puss in Boots"), The Huntsman (in "Snow White and the Seven Dwarfs"), Army General (in "The Six Who Went Far"), Old Wolf (in "The Old Sultan"), Gargoyle (in "The Naughty Spirit"), King (in "Cinderella"), Goblin Bandit #4 (in "The Old Woman in the Woods"), Landlord (in "The Faithful Watchman"), Old King (in "The Coat of Many Colors"), Giant (in "The Brave Little Tailor"), Wolf (in "The Wren & the Bear"), Councilor (in "Rumpelstiltskin")
 Philece Sampler - 
 Brianne Siddall - Rapunzel's Son (in "Rapunzel"), Lisbeth (in "The Old Woman in the Woods"), Child 1 (in "The Hare & the Hedgehog")
 Michael Sorich - Dog (in "The Bremen Town Musicians"), Friday (in "Snow White and the Seven Dwarfs"), Muscles (in "The Six Who Went Far"), The Old Woodsman (in "The Water of Life"), Josephine's First Brother (in "Bluebeard"), Second Prince (in "The Six Swans"), General 2 (in "The Brave Little Tailor"), General Bear (in "The Wren & the Bear")
 Melodee Spevack - Peasant's Wife (in "The Faithful Watchman"), Evil Queen (in "The Six Swans")
 Doug Stone - Brave Soldier (in "The Faithful Watchman")
 Kirk Thornton - Rapunzel's Father (in "Rapunzel"), General 1 (in "The Brave Little Tailor")
 Clifton Wells - Sunday (in "Snow White and the Seven Dwarfs")
 Jeff Winkless - The Old Man (in "The Golden Goose"), Old Samuel (in "The Hare & the Hedgehog")
 Dan Woren - The Frog Prince (in "The Princess & the Frog"), Hans (in "The Golden Goose"), Prince (in "Snow White and the Seven Dwarfs"), Two-Tailed Fox (in "The Wedding of Mrs. Fox"), Soldier (in "The Brave Little Tailor"), King (in "Rumpelstiltskin")
 Tom Wyner - Hans' Father (in "The Golden Goose"), Wednesday (in "Snow White and the Seven Dwarfs"), King (in "The Six Who Went Far"), The King (in "The Water of Life"), Knight (in "The Water of Life"), King (in "The Brave Little Tailor")

Crew

Japanese crew 
 Hifumi Fuji (Hiroshi Saito) - Script Adaptation, Writer
 Nobuyuki Fujimoto - Script Adaptation, Writer
 Yu Yamamoto - Script Adaptation, Writer
 Akira Miyazaki - Script Adaptation, Writer
 Shuichi Seki - Character design 
 Yasuji Mori - Character design 
 Noboru Takano - Character design 
 Hirokazu Ishino - Character design 
 Shuichi Ishii - Character design 
 Susumu Shiraume - Character design 
 Issei Takematsu - Character design 
 Tetsuya Ishikawa - Character design
 Ryuji Matsudo - Producer
 Shinji Nabeshima - Producer
 Hiroshi Saito - Director
 Shigeru Ohmachi - Director
 Kazuyoshi Yokota - Director
 Takayoshi Suzuki - Director
 Jiro Saito - Director

English crew 
 Robert Axelrod - Script Adaptation, Writer
 Melora Harte - Script Adaptation, Writer
 Steve Kramer - Writer
 Morgan Lofting - Script Adaptation, Writer
 Kerrigan Mahan - Director
 Dave Mallow - Script Adaptation, Writer
 Edie Mirman - Writer
 Kevin Newson - Assistant Engineer
 Tony Oliver - Script Supervisor, Script Adaptation, Writer
 Scott Page-Pagter - Voice Director, ADR Engineer
 Eric S. Rollman - Post-Production Supervisor
 Haim Saban - Executive Producer
 David Walsh - Voice Director, ADR Engineer
 Jeff Winkless - Script Adaptation, Writer
 Tom Wyner - Director

Music 
In Japan, for both seasons, the series used two theme songs; the opening theme, and the ending theme, were both performed by Ushio Hashimoto. Incidental music used in the Japanese version was composed by Hideo Shimazu. The theme tune and incidental music used in the English dub were both composed by Haim Saban and Shuki Levy. Most of the incidental music was in fact recycled from the earlier VHS series My Favorite Fairy Tales.

Releases 
Limited episodes were produced in NTSC VHS by Saban International and distributed by Starmaker Entertainment Inc. and Hi-Tops Video/Fisher-Price in 1990 and Video Treasures/HGV Video Productions in 1992. Those volumes included:
 Beauty and the Beast (UPC: 0-1313-29408-3)
 The Six Who Went Far (UPC: 0-90251-94073-6)
 Hansel & Gretel (UPC: 0-92091-4105-3)
 Briar Rose
 Brother & Sister
 The Coat of Many Colors
 Jorinda and Joringel
 King Grizzlebeard
 Marriage of Mrs. Fox
 Mother Holle
 Old Sultan
 The Spirit in the Bottle
 The Frog Prince
 The Man of Iron
 The Secret Heart
 The Six Swans
 The Water of Life
 Grimm Brothers' Scary Fairy Tales
 Snow White
 Cinderella

A few episodes were released to a single Region 2 DVD titled "Grimm's Fairy Tale Classics - Volume One" under distribution by Fox Kids and Maximum Entertainment Ltd. in 2004. The episodes included were:
 Hansel and Gretel
 Little Red Riding Hood
 The Golden Goose
 Snow White And Rose Red
 Beauty and the Beast

The British newspapers Daily Mirror and Sunday Mirror released the following episodes on promotional DVDs:
 Snow White
 Bluebeard
 The Frog Prince
 Rapunzel
 Rumpelstiltskin
 Cinderella
 Beauty and the Beast
 Puss N' Boots
 Little Red Riding Hood
 The Golden Goose
 Hansel and Gretel

The original Japanese version of the series was released as a 5-disc DVD set in Region 2 with 10 episodes from the series.

Despite a large cult following, none of the English dub were released on DVD in Region 1 for many years and only limited episodes (listed above) were released in Region 2. The rights to the English dub (owned by The Walt Disney Company following their purchase of Fox Family Worldwide in 2001) reverted to Nippon Animation on July 19, 2005 (series 1) and March 31, 2006 (series 2).

Discotek Media acquired the rights to release the series on SD-BD. The first volume was released on May 25, 2021, and the second volume was released on August 31 the same year. The releases included both the original Japanese versions of the episodes, along with the English dubs by Saban Entertainment, reconstructed using video from the Japanese version and audio from the dub masters. The Season 1 release included alternative English versions of The Travelling Musicians of Bremen and Bluebeard. The Season 2 release included the English versions of The Crystal Ball, The Iron Stove, The Water Nixie, and The Godfather of Death, which had never aired in North America. The Season 1 episode The Six Who Went Far is incorrectly titled The Six Who Went Too Far in the Discotek release.

Season 1 of the English dub is available on Amazon Prime in the USA.

Title translations
 Baśnie Braci Grimm (Polish title)
 Cuentos de los hermanos Grimm (Spanish title) (Latin America only)
 Soñar con los ojos abiertos (Spanish title (Spain only)
 Grimm Masterpiece Theater (English title)
 Grimm Meisaku Gekijō (Japanese title)
 Grimm's Fairy Tale Classics (English title)
 Le Fiabe son Fantasia (Italian title)
 Raconte moi une Histoire (French title)
 فى جعبتى حكاية (Arabic title)
 グリム名作劇場 (Japanese title)
 格林童話劇場 (Chinese title)
 Grimm legszebb meséi (Hungarian title)
 Grimms Märchen (German title)
 Os Teus Contos Clássicos (Portuguese title) (never been released on TV, but only on DVD and VHS)
 Бајке браће Грим (Serbian title)
 אגדות האחים גרים (Hebrew title)
 Сказки братьев Гримм (Russian title)
 Приказките на Братя Грим (Bulgarian title)
 Aka-uka Grimm ertaklari (Uzbek title)

References

External links 
 Grimm's Fairy Tales catalogue listing at the official Nippon Animation website.
 
 

1987 anime television series debuts
1988 anime television series debuts
1980s Nickelodeon original programming
1990s Nickelodeon original programming
Animation anthology series
Discotek Media
Adventure anime and manga
Fantasy anime and manga
Romance anime and manga
Fiction about shapeshifting
Japanese children's animated adventure television series
Japanese children's animated fantasy television series
Nippon Animation
Television series by Saban Entertainment
Television shows based on fairy tales
Anime and manga based on fairy tales
TV Asahi original programming
Fox Kids
Children's manga
Nine Network original programming